Darncombe-cum-Langdale End is a civil parish in the Scarborough district of North Yorkshire, England.

According to the 2001 UK census, Darncombe-cum-Langdale End parish had a population of 42. The population remained at less than 100 according to the 2011 census. Details are included in the civil parish of Hackness.

In June 2004, the village became the first location in Britain, to become home to a Coptic Orthodox Church of Alexandria monastery (St. Athanasius).

The parish council is Hackness & Harwood Dale Group Parish Council which covers the six parishes of Broxa-cum-Troutsdale, Darncombe-cum-Langdale End, Hackness, Harwood Dale, Silpho and Suffield-cum-Everley.

References

External links
Hackness & Harwood Dale Group Parish Council website

Civil parishes in North Yorkshire